"I Do", also known as Robin's Song, is a song written and recorded by Canadian country music artist Paul Brandt.  It was released in July 1996 as the second single from his debut album Calm Before the Storm.  The song reached number 2 on the Billboard Hot Country Singles & Tracks chart and number 1 on the Canadian RPM Country Tracks chart.  It is his most successful song to date and his highest-charting song in the United States.

Content
Although many claim it was written for his wife Robin (hence why it is also called Robin's Song), his wife's name is Liz and Brandt has stated he wrote the song for his friend's wedding.  https://www.facebook.com/PaulBrandtOfficial/photos/a.433274855635/10156711864880636/?type=3

Chart performance
"I Do" spent two weeks at number one on the Canadian country charts beginning the week of August 26, 1996.

Year-end charts

References

1996 singles
Paul Brandt songs
Song recordings produced by Josh Leo
Reprise Records singles
1996 songs
Songs written by Paul Brandt
Canadian Country Music Association Single of the Year singles
Canadian Country Music Association Video of the Year videos